Christina Schild is an Austrian-born Canadian actress.

Biography
She was born in Vienna, Austria and has one sister. Holds a graduate degree in actor training from the American Academy of Dramatic Arts in New York City.  Schild portrays Playa Palacios in Battlestar Galactica.

Roles

Film/Television 
 Stargate Universe - Andrea Palmer
 Alien Trespass - Darlene
 Battlestar Galactica - Playa Palacios
 Smallville
 The L Word - Lassoed
 21 Jump Street - Donna

Theatre 
 Poor Super Man - Kryla
 An Ideal Husband - Mrs. Cheveley
 Titus Andronicus - Emellius
 Hay Fever - Myra
 Don't Dress For Dinner - Suzanne
 Julius Caesar - Pindarus
 A Soldier Dreams - Tish (Pickled Productions)
 School Inc. - Suzanne
 Jeffrey - Debra

References

External links
 

Canadian film actresses
Canadian stage actresses
Canadian television actresses
Living people
Actresses from Vienna
American Academy of Dramatic Arts alumni
Austrian emigrants to Canada
Year of birth missing (living people)